Isaiah Dargan (born August 12, 1995) is an American professional soccer player.

Career

College and amateur
After playing at youth level at De La Salle High School in Concord, California and with the San Jose Earthquakes academy, Dargan played four years of college soccer at Chico State University between 2013 and 2016. During his time with the Wildcats, Dargan was a two-time CCAA All-Academic award winner, and made 68 appearances for the team.

Following college, Dargan spent time in the United Premier Soccer League with Contra Costas, as well as in the USL League Two with Burlingame Dragons and San Francisco Glens. In 2019, Dargan was named to the UPSL Best XI for Contra Costas.

Professional
On January 8, 2020, Dargan signed his first professional contract, joining USL League One side Chattanooga Red Wolves ahead of their 2020 season. He made his professional debut on October 17, 2020, appearing as an 82nd-minute substitute during a 1–1 draw with Forward Madison.

References

External links
 
 

1995 births
Living people
American soccer players
Association football defenders
Chico State Wildcats men's soccer players
Burlingame Dragons FC players
San Francisco Glens players
Chattanooga Red Wolves SC players
Soccer players from California
People from Concord, California
USL League One players
USL League Two players